Tetyana Olehivna Ramus (born on 17 July 1980 in Kiev, Soviet Union) is an artist, designer, TV and radio journalist, public activist, producer, publisher, author, and presenter. Since 2019 she is the Ambassador "White Ribbon Ukraine" and "White Ribbon USA".

Early life 

Tetyana Ramus was born in Kiev. Her father is a specialist in the leather industry and her mother is an economist.

Tetyana graduated from high school in 1997 and completed her undergraduate education from Taras Shevchenko National University of Kyiv in 2002.

Simultaneously, Tetyana pursued a career in modeling. She worked in the modeling agencies "Line 12" and "Karin Models".

In 1998, Tetyana married Igor Voronov, a Ukrainian businessman, public figure, and patron of the arts. The couple had a daughter named Anna Voronova.

Career in television 

Tetyana Ramus's television career has been active since 1999. From 1999 to 2001, Tetyana was the host and subsequently the head of the "M-style" program (STB TV channel). The program was a television documentary on the Ukrainian style of life. The purpose of the program was to show the lifestyle of those who achieved success and popularity.

From 2002 to 2004, Tetyana was the author and presenter of the TV project "Nota Bené" TET (TV channel). The concept of the program was based on Tatyana's portrait interviews with famous people and her coverage of large-scale cultural and sporting events in the country. The program framework, made in cooperation with the Reuters agency, also included reporting on the latest news from the world of show business and the film industry.

In 2005, Tetyana was the author and presenter of the TV-project "A Special Case" (TV-channel Tonis (Ukraine)). The mission of the program was to provide psychological and image assistance to women who had reached a dead end in their lives. Together with a team of professionals, specialists, and psychologists, the necessary tasks were implemented to change the psychological and visual state of the heroines. Many of the participants were able to radically change their lives for the better after completing the program.

From 2008 to 2013, Ramus developed the first Ukrainian multimedia social and information project, "Pay attention with Tetyana Ramus!". The genre was social encyclopedia. Each program not only raised the most pressing issues in the lives of Ukrainians, but also gave specific instructions on how to solve the problem, and included advice from the best experts in the field of medicine, society, politics, law, and more. The project "Pay attention" when active united four main media formats: television, radio, printed edition and Internet site ("5 Kanal" and "Inter" TV channels, Radio "Era"; website: www.ramus.ua ). 
In 2009 she founded a magazine of the same name, "Pay attention with Tetyana Ramus!", a monthly themed guide expanding on issues covered in the earlier projects.

In 2010, Tetyana Ramus presented the cultural and social project "Pay attention on...". Ukrainian celebrities from the politics, culture and sports fields participated. Guests worked with famous artists to express their attitudes towards social problems, often focused on what they viewed as pressing problems in society deserving of public attention. Singer Iryna Bilyk together with the artist Alexander Roiburd created a work called "Time that is not enough for good deals!". Oleg Skrypka with Vladislav Shereshevsky wrote a picture "Garbage is all around!". Irena Kilchitskaya and Oksana Mas presented the work "Understand values!". Stella Zakharova and Vladimir Bovkun demonstrated the painting "Love is near!".

Tetyana Ramus regularly participates as an invited expert in Internet conferences devoted to the most topical issues in Ukrainian life (www.rbc.ua, www.for-ua.com, www.glavred.info, www.tochka.net, etc.), in the popular discussion TV-shows on Ukraine (TV channel), Inter (TV channel), UA:First ("Talking Ukraine", "About Life", "PravDyvo show with Eva Bazhen").

#ARTRAMUS 

In 2012 Tetyana Ramus founded the brand #ARTRAMUS, which combined modern art and high fashion.

In 2015, in Basel (Switzerland), Tetyana Ramus represented Ukraine at the world fair of modern art, Art Basel, where she presented the series of "Dresses" works.

She is the author of the idea of the collection, which was presented at the final of the contest "Miss Universe - 2016" in the Philippines.

The creative workshop of Tetyana Ramus, which is also a family art gallery, is located in Kyiv on Pechersk.

In 2019, ARTRAMUS gallery entered the list of official locations of the art festival Kyiv Art Week. As part of the event program, Tetyana Ramus presented the first CATS exhibition in the ARTRAMUS space. At the opening of the exhibition, a lecture was held by Nikolai Palazhchenko - art dealer, curator, art critic, art historian and Art Basel VIP Representative in the Baltic and CIS countries.

Social activity 

Tetyana Ramus is a permanent active participant, organizer and partner of various charity and social projects, such as:

 The social project "Pay attention on..." with the participation of the leading persons of the political and creative elite of Ukraine
 Annual Ukrainian National Award "Person of the Year" (2009-2011) 
 AVON charity marathons against breast cancer ("One day walking for life") (2008-2011) 
 Annual charity marathons "Run under chestnuts" (2009-2011)
 The All-Ukrainian Award "Woman of ІІІ millennium"(2009)
 The All-Ukrainian Award "The Wonder-child" (2009)

In 2019. Tetyana Ramus joined the White Ribbon Campaign, an international social movement for the protection of victims of domestic violence.
The goal of the collaboration is to bring together international and national opinion leaders around the concept #ChangeHelpPrevent.

1 June 2019. ARTRAMUS headed by Tetyana Ramus and White Ribbon Ukraine held the first joint thematic seminar dedicated to the International Children's Day.

In May 2021, Tetyana Ramus took part with a report at the V International Open GR Forum in Istanbul, where she presented to international partners the activities of the White Ribbon Ukraine and the organization's experience in protecting the rights of victims of domestic violence.

In November 2021, the Tetyana Ramus Foundation became a partner of the first Ukrainian mobile application against violence, White Ribbon UA. The application was developed and launched with the support of the Democracy Fund of the US Embassy in Ukraine.

Additionally, within the “16 days against violence” campaign in November 2021, Tetyana Ramus together with “White Ribbon” implemented the social art project “This is not a game” with the support of Ministry of Culture and Information Policy.

Information art exhibition as well was presented in Verkhovna Rada of Ukraine with the participation of parliamentarians.

Other projects 

In 2011 Tetyana took part in the shooting of the short film "Actors" (one of the main roles, directed by Tetyana Goncharova).

She participates in performances of the project "Theatre without actors" ("Old New Story", scriptwriter and director — Natalia Vodolazko, Kiev, 2016).

In 2015 she started "The Academy of adulthood for teenagers" — an alternative educational program for teenagers.

Awards 

 1st-place winner in the contest "Black Pearl" in the nomination "The best model - TV presenter in Ukraine" (2001)
 Award Fondazione Mazzoleni "For international Artist" (Italy, Venice, 2017)

References

External links
 http://ramus.ua Personal site (redirects to https://web.archive.org/web/20170629070124/http://artramus.com/ )
  On dressing style.

Interviews, web conferences:
 
 
 
 
 
 

Travel notes:
 

1980 births
Living people
Television presenters from Kyiv
Ukrainian socialites
University of Kyiv, Law faculty alumni
Ukrainian fashion designers
Ukrainian women fashion designers
Ukrainian women journalists
Ukrainian television journalists
Ukrainian producers
Television producers
Women television producers
Ukrainian television presenters
Ukrainian women television presenters